Robbie McCallum (born 26 August 1967) is a Scottish screenwriter and novelist whose stories mix comedy, drama, social realism, and strong characters with a driving narrative. He has won numerous Awards for creative writing and was nominated for a BAFTA for his filmscript  Rank. His debut novel I'll Be Your Dog, a comedy set in New Orleans, was released in 2010 and made the Amazon Top 10 Comedy List.

Biography 

McCallum was born in Govanhill, Glasgow. When he was 10 in the late 1970s, his family moved to England in search of work. He left school at 15 and joined the railway as an apprentice electrician. He subsequently attended the University of Nottingham, Universite D'Orsay and the London College of Printing. McCallum is married to the film Production Designer, Sue Ferguson. They have two children and live in Brighton (UK) and Mindelo, São Vicente (Cabo Verde).

Work

Screenplays 

 Sixty Cups of Coffee, 2000, short film
 Life By the Drop, 2002, short film
 Rank, 2003, short film
 The Fall of Shug McCracken, 2005, short film
 Hips, Lips and Fingertips, 2007, feature film
 The Road to Marfa Lights, 2008, feature film
 The Green Room, 2009, feature film
 Saviour, 2010, feature film
 The Brighton Send Off, 2014, feature film
 Atlantic Heart, 2014, feature film
 Bulldog Breed, 2017, feature film

Novels 

 I'll Be Your Dog, 2010
 Smiling Out Loud, 2011

Directing 

 Franco's Famous Cheekball, 2014, Short Film
 Monkfish, 2014, Short Film
 Brighton Is Falling, 2016, Music Video
 Atlantic Heart, 2016, Feature Film
 The Black Black, 2017, Short Film

Awards 

 In 2002, McCallum was a BBC Talent finalist for his film Sixty Cups of Coffee
 In 2003,  Life By The Drop won the Audience Award at the Dallas International Film Festival
 In 2003,  Rank won the London Production Award, was and was subsequently nominated for a BAFTA
 In 2005, The Fall of Shug McCracken was Awarded Production Funding from Scottish Screen. The film was produced in Glasgow and Texas, USA and went on to win the Best Comedy Award at the Santa Monica Film Festival
 In 2008, The Road to Marfa Lights was Awarded Development funding from Scottish Screen

References

Pan African Film Festival Los Angeles World Premiere Screening of Atlantic Heart
Seattle International Film Festival Screening of Atlantic Heart
Africa In Motion UK Premiere Glasgow of Atlantic Heart
Cine-City English Premiere of Atlantic Heart

External links 

Review of Rank by Angus Wolfe Murray
Review of Sixty Cups of Coffee by Chris Parcellin 
Interview with Robbie McCallum, Retro Magazine, Issue 6, 2010
Interview Q&A with Robbie McCallum at The Brighton Film Festival, 2016
Interview with Robbie McCallum in The Argus, 2016
Review of Atlantic Heart by Andrew Murray, 2016

Living people
1967 births
People from Govanhill and Crosshill
Scottish screenwriters
Scottish film directors
Scottish novelists
Writers from Glasgow
Alumni of the University of Nottingham
Paris-Sud University alumni
Anglo-Scots
British expatriates in Cape Verde
People from Brighton